Lai Hau Hei (born 19 January 1995 in Hong Kong) is a former Hong Kong professional footballer who currently plays for Hong Kong First Division club Happy Valley.

Early life 
Lai was born and raised in Yuen Long, an area in the northwest of Hong Kong.

Club career 
During his youth, Lai trained in football with Pegasus which were then based on Tin Shui Wai.

Lai was offered his first contract in professional football by Rangers with whom he signed with in 2012. Lau made his professional debut on 2 September 2012 in a 5–1 Senior Shield loss to Citizen. He scored his first professional goal on 13 April 2015 in the 2014–15 Hong Kong FA Cup win over South China.

In 2015, Lai joined his home district club of Yuen Long.

In July 2017, it was announced that Lai had moved to Dreams.

On 7 August 2019, it was revealed that Lai had rejoined Yuen Long.

On 16 September 2021, First Division side Happy Valley announced Lau as a player.

International career
In 2016, Lai was selected to the Hong Kong U-21 squad to play in an exhibition tournament in Singapore.

In 2017, he was on the Hong Kong U-22 squad which travelled to North Korea for the 2018 AFC U-23 Championship qualification group stage. He appeared in all three of Hong Kong's matches.

References

External links
Lai Hau Hei at HKFA

1995 births
Hong Kong people
Hong Kong footballers
Hong Kong Premier League players
Hong Kong First Division League players
Hong Kong Rangers FC players
Yuen Long FC players
Dreams Sports Club players
Happy Valley AA players
Living people
Association football defenders
Association football midfielders